Koi Aanay Wala Hai (Urdu: کوئی آنے والا ہے, literal English translation: "someone is coming") is the fifth studio album by the Pakistani pop band Strings, released on 16 May 2008.

Track listing

All songs are written by Anwar Maqsood, those which are not are mentioned below.
All songs are composed by Bilal Maqsood.

Personnel
All information is taken from the CD.

Strings
 Faisal Kapadia: lead vocals
 Bilal Maqsood: vocals, lead guitar

Additional musicians
 Drums and Percussion: John "Gumby" Louis Pinto
 Flute: Sajid
 Bass: Shakir
 Guitars: Shuja Haider & Imran Akhoond
 Keyboards: Shuja Haider

Production
Produced by Strings and John Abraham Entertainment
Arranged by Shuja Haider
Drums sequenced by Shuja Haider
Recording engineered by Faisal Rafi
Studio assistance at Silent Studio by Nadeem Durrani
Mixing engineered by Shantanu Hudlikar
Mixing assistance by Abhishek & Ishaq Nazeer 
Mixed at Yashraj Studios Mumbai, India
Vocal recording at Silent Studio, Karachi
Mastered at Sterling Sound, New York City, by Chris Athens
Recorded & mixed by Ishaq Nazeer at Hill Music Studios, Karachi, Pakistan
Album art by Aamir Shah
Photography by Usman & Tejal

Awards
 Strings won the Best Album Award for "Koi Aanay Wala Hai" at MTV Awards 2009.

Notes

External links
Strings Online - Official Website

2008 albums
Urdu-language albums
Strings (band) albums